Howell Peak is a small rock peak,  high, on the northwestern end of the Daniels Range in the Usarp Mountains of Antarctica. It was mapped by the United States Geological Survey from surveys and U.S. Navy aerial photographs, 1960–62, and was named by the Advisory Committee on Antarctic Names for Kenneth R. Howell, a United States Antarctic Research Program meteorologist at South Pole Station, 1967–68.

References

Mountains of Oates Land